Lonesome Luke's Wild Women is a 1917 American short comedy film starring Harold Lloyd. A print of the film exists in a collection.

Cast
 Harold Lloyd as Lonesome Luke
 Bebe Daniels
 Snub Pollard
 Bud Jamison
 Sammy Brooks
 W.L. Adams
 David Voorhees
 Charles Stevenson - (as Charles E. Stevenson)
 Billy Fay
 Sandy Roth
 Margaret Joslin - (as Margaret Joslin Todd)
 Fred C. Newmeyer
 Gilbert Pratt
 Max Hamburger
 Gus Leonard
 Marie Mosquini
 Dorothea Wolbert

Production
Lonesome Luke's Wild Women was filmed on Deadman's Island off San Pedro, Los Angeles, California, which was later removed in 1928  as part of a harbor development effort.

Reception
Like many American films of the time, Lonesome Luke's Wild Women was subject to cuts by city and state film censorship boards. The Chicago Board of Censors required a cut in the first vision scene of the harem girls in transparent trousers.

See also
 Harold Lloyd filmography

References

External links

1917 films
1917 short films
American silent short films
1917 comedy films
American black-and-white films
Films directed by Hal Roach
Silent American comedy films
Lonesome Luke films
American comedy short films
1910s American films